Stand Up is the second studio album by British rock band Jethro Tull, released in 1969. It was the first Jethro Tull album to feature guitarist Martin Barre, who would go on to become the band's longtime guitarist until its initial dissolution in 2012.  Before recording sessions for the album began, the band's original guitarist Mick Abrahams departed the band as a result of musical differences with frontman and primary songwriter Ian Anderson; Abrahams wanted to stay with the blues rock sound of their 1968 debut, This Was, while Anderson wished to add other musical influences such as folk rock.

Stand Up represents the first album project on which Anderson was in full control of the music and lyrics. The result was an eclectic album with various styles and instrumentation appearing in its songs.

The album quickly went to No. 1 on the UK charts, further launching the band's career, while the non-album single "Living in the Past" peaked at No. 3. The album was also Jethro Tull's first success in the United States, reaching No. 20 on the Billboard 200.

Background
Jethro Tull released their debut album This Was in October 1968. During the recording of This Was, frontman Ian Anderson began writing new material which differed from the straight blues/jazz fusion style which the band were known for at the time. Anderson estimated that he wrote "50 percent" of Stand Up during the summer of 1968. Anderson wrote the album's songs on an acoustic guitar in his bedsit in Kentish Town, London, and cited Roy Harper, Ornette Coleman, Charlie Parker, Bert Jansch, Pentangle, Blind Faith and Jimi Hendrix as inspirations. The new material's departure from the band's blues-based style caused conflict with guitarist Mick Abrahams, who was a blues purist: Anderson recalled "running some of [the new songs] by Mick Abrahams, and coming to the conclusion that they weren't going up to be up his street at all" while drummer Clive Bunker stated that "when Ian started to write new and different stuff, that's when we realised we were going to have serious problems, because Mick just didn't want to do it." The stylistic clash resulted in Abrahams' departure from the band in December 1968. The band initially began rehearsals for Stand Up with Black Sabbath guitarist Tony Iommi, however Iommi left the band after only a few weeks as he felt he did not fit in well with the group. The job eventually went to Martin Barre, who immediately joined rehearsals for Stand Up before making his live debut with the band on 30 December 1968.

The band then embarked on a short Swedish tour to support Jimi Hendrix in January 1969 before embarking on a three-month U.S. tour (the band's first) during which the band recorded the non-album single "Living in the Past" and B-side "Driving Song" at the behest of manager Terry Ellis to "keep the pot boiling" in the UK. Following the end of the tour in April, the band returned to the UK to begin recording sessions for the new album.

Recording
The band began recording the album on 17 April 1969, recording "A New Day Yesterday" and finished on 21 May 1969, finishing "Look Into the Sun". Recording was briefly paused in early-mid May for the band to embark on a joint headlining tour of the UK and France with Ten Years After. All of the songs were recorded at Studio 2 of Morgan Studios, except for "Bourée" which was recorded at Olympic Studios because Morgan was already booked for the day (although takes of the song were also recorded at Morgan). The general routine was that the band would arrive at the studio at 9:00 am to work on one or two songs which would be finished by 4:00 or 5:00 pm. Anderson cited Morgan Studios' modern 8-track recording facilities as "a big help", saying that "8-track was the beginning of that creative freedom without which it would have been much harder to have made the Stand Up album." The band praised recording engineer Andy Johns, who they found easy to work with. Johns tried some innovative recording techniques on the album; for example on "A New Day Yesterday" he achieved a swirling, stereo-shifting guitar effect by swinging an expensive Neumann U67 microphone on its cable in wide circles around the studio.

The majority of the album was recorded live with the entire band, with minimal overdubs, however primarily acoustic songs such as "Look Into the Sun" and "Fat Man" were recorded mostly solo by Anderson. The song "Bourée" proved the most difficult to record, with the band unsatisfied with any of the takes they recorded. The final version of the song was compiled later from several takes, with additional overdubs added by Anderson. Bass guitar on "Look Into the Sun" was recorded by Johns, as bassist Glenn Cornick was not present at the session (Johns' performance was uncredited on the album). One song titled "Early in the Morning" had its backing track recorded but was aborted during the sessions and was never released. The band also recorded the backing track for "Play in Time" during the sessions, a song which would later be finished and released on the band's next album Benefit.

Album cover
The design of the album cover started with a visit to New Haven, Connecticut during a concert tour in late February 1969. Under the direction of producer Terry Ellis, the band met a woodcarver named James Grashow who followed them for a week in order to properly represent them in wood. The resulting gatefold album cover, in a woodcut style designed by Grashow, originally opened up like a children's pop-up book so that a cut-out of the band's personnel stood up, evoking the album's title. Stand Up won New Musical Expresss award for best album artwork in 1969. The pop-up was not carried over to the 1973 album reissue.

Musical style
The album still shows a great blues influence, as in the first track "A New Day Yesterday". Some songs on the album exhibit unusual instrumentation, such as "Fat Man" played on a mandolin and "Jeffery Goes to Leicester Square" played on a balalaika. The acoustic pieces, like "Reasons for Waiting", already show Anderson under the influence of Roy Harper. The instrumental "Bourée" (one of Jethro Tull's popular concert pieces) is a jazzy re-working of "Bourrée in E minor" by Johann Sebastian Bach. On the other hand, "Nothing Is Easy" is a jazz-rock song with drums and electric guitar that contrasts with the acoustic material on the album.

Ian Anderson has speculated that the chord progression in "We Used to Know" was picked up subconsciously by the Eagles when they toured together in 1971 or 1972 and used in their song "Hotel California". However Don Felder, who wrote the music for "Hotel California", did not join Eagles until 1974. In a 2016 interview, Anderson stated that the chord progression had likely been used in earlier songs and also called "Hotel California" a "much better song" than "We Used to Know".

Themes
Anderson has described the album's lyrics as composing of a mixture of made up scenarios, occasionally mixed with biographical anecdotes or experiences from his personal life. Songs like "Back to the Family" and "For a Thousand Mothers" were influenced by Anderson's rocky relationship with his parents at the time, while "We Used to Know" describes the band's difficult life of financial hardship before finding success. Anderson has denied that songs concerning relationships such as "A New Day Yesterday", "Look Into the Sun" and "Reasons for Waiting" were inspired by real life experiences, saying that "I've always had a feeling that you don't talk about real stuff when it comes to that, and that you shouldn't betray real relationships in songs." Anderson wrote "Fat Man" as a reference to former guitarist Mick Abrahams (who was the largest member of the group), however Anderson has denied that the song was intended as an insult. "Jeffrey Goes to Leicester Square" references Anderson's friend Jeffrey Hammond, who was also referenced on This Was and would later join Jethro Tull as bassist in 1970.

Critical reception and legacy

Stand Up received mixed reviews upon its release, but more recent evaluations praised the album as a whole, for the production and musicianship.

The 1969 Rolling Stone review was quite positive, stating that the album "has a fairly low raunch quotient, true to form, but it is quite marvellous" and also that "the album is not really funky; rather, it is a meticulously crafted work (no sterility implied) which deserves careful listening. At a time when many of the established stars are faltering, it is a particular pleasure to hear an important new voice." The contemporary Disc and Music Echo review was less favourable; it considered the expensive cover the "most impressive" part of the album and Jethro Tull a good live band but still incapable of producing a "musically interesting" release. American critic Robert Christgau reiterated his dislike of the band, but judged the album "adequate" in his Village Voice review.

A retrospective AllMusic review was positive, saying that the band had "solidified their sound" with the album, bringing an "English folk music" influence to several of the songs, atop an overall blues rock foundation. Sean Murphy of PopMatters more emphatically wrote that Stand Up was a "meaningful document from what turned out to be a very transitional moment in rock history... a document created in a rapidly closing artistic window, pre-prog but post-British blues and psychedelic rock." He praised the musicianship of the players and remarked the first examples of "the first-rate lyricist Anderson would quickly become." The Record Collector review highlights how "the album captured the band on a vertiginous upswing, jubilant with confidence following the drafting in of guitarist Martin Barre" and contained "a fresh batch of diverse but uniformly strong compositions".

It was voted number 513 in Colin Larkin's All Time Top 1000 Albums 3rd Edition (2000).

A variety of rock artists have cited Stand Up as an all-time favourite album over the years, including Pearl Jam's Eddie Vedder, Aerosmith's Tom Hamilton, Joe Bonamassa, and Joe Satriani.

During an interview with BraveWords in 2015, Anderson selected Stand Up as his favourite Tull album: "I suppose if you were to really twist my arm, I would probably go back to 1969, with the Stand Up album, because that was my first album of first really original music. It has a special place in my heart." Barre and Bunker have also ranked it as being among their favorite Tull albums.

Releases
The album was reissued in 1973 by Chrysalis Records.

In 1989 a MFSL remaster was released, with catalogue number UDCD 524. The booklet featured the pop-up woodcut band.

The album was reissued again in 2001 as a digital remaster, this time with 4 bonus tracks.

It was reissued on 5 October 2010 as a deluxe edition, including six bonus tracks on disc one, and two additional discs: a CD of live material recorded at Carnegie Hall on 4 November 1970, and a DVD with a DTS surround mix of the concert as well as an Interview with Ian Anderson. The material was mixed by Peter Mew at the Abbey Road studios.

It was released again in November 2016 in a box set with two CDs and one DVD, named Stand Up - The Elevated Edition. The box contains rare and previously unreleased music (such as an alternate take of "Bourée", BBC tracks, radio spots and vintage stereo promo mixes of "Living in the Past" and "Driving Song" previously unreleased on CD) including new stereo and 5.1 mixes of the album and bonus tracks by Steven Wilson, and a live presentation, from a concert in Sweden in 1969 (original mono mix). It also includes a 112-page booklet featuring track-by-track annotations by Ian Anderson, an extensive history of the album, rare and unseen photographs and a reproduction of the original pop-up book artwork designed by James Grashow.

It was re-released again on 180 gram vinyl with the original tracks in February 2017. This time it came with the gatefold cover and the "pop up" band inside.

Reissued on 2 LPs at 45RPM in October 2022 by Analogue Productions.  Mastered and cut by Kevin gray from the original U.K. Island analog tape.  Plated at QRP with Initial press run at RTI.  Gatefold "tip on" jacket manufactured by Stoughton Printing, faithfully reproducing the original pop-up of the band members from the initial release.

Track listings
All songs written by Ian Anderson, unless otherwise indicated. (Original LP album states "All titles written by Ian Anderson").

1969 original release

1973 cassette version has same track order, but on opposite sides.
Sides one and two were combined as tracks 1–10 on CD reissues.

2010 collector's edition (3 discs)

2016 The Elevated Edition

PersonnelJethro Tull Ian Anderson – vocals, flute, acoustic guitar, Hammond organ, piano, mandolin, balalaika, mouth organ, production
 Martin Barre – electric guitar, additional flute (on tracks 2 and 9)
 Glenn Cornick – bass guitar (all tracks but 5 and 7)
 Clive Bunker – drums, percussionProduction Terry Ellis – production, cover concept
 Andy Johns – engineer, bass guitar on track 5 (uncredited)
 Dee Palmer – string arrangements and conductor on track 9
 John Williams – cover concept
 James Grashow – cover art

Charts
The album reached No. 1 on the British charts, also selling well in the United States, where it reached No. 20. In the Norwegian charts (where the band toured along with Jimi Hendrix), the album charted at No. 5.

 

Album

Singles

 Certifications 

ReferencesCitationsSources'''

 
 

External links
 Jethro Tull - Stand Up'' (1969) album at the Jethro Tull Official Website: JethroTull.com
 Jethro Tull - Stand Up (1969) album review by Bruce Eder, credits & releases at AllMusic.com
 Jethro Tull - Stand Up (1969) album releases & credits at Discogs.com
 Jethro Tull - Stand Up (1969) album credits & user reviews at ProgArchives.com

Jethro Tull (band) albums
1969 albums
Island Records albums
Reprise Records albums
Chrysalis Records albums
Albums produced by Ian Anderson
Albums produced by Terry Ellis (record producer)
Albums recorded at Morgan Sound Studios
Albums recorded at Olympic Sound Studios